Kim Yeong-taek (born August 24, 2001) is a South Korean diver. He competed in the 2020 Summer Olympics. His older brother Kim Yeong-nam is also a diver.

References

External links
 

South Korean male divers
Divers at the 2020 Summer Olympics
Olympic divers of South Korea
Sportspeople from Incheon
2001 births
Living people
21st-century South Korean people